General elections were held in Tanzania on 31 October 2010. The presidential elections were won by the incumbent President Jakaya Kikwete of the Chama Cha Mapinduzi party (CCM), who received 63% of the vote. The parliamentary elections resulted in a victory for the CCM, which won 186 of the 239 elected seats.

In the elections in semi-autonomous Zanzibar, Ali Mohamed Shein of the CCM won the presidential election, whilst the CCM also won the most seats in the House of Representatives.

Electoral system
For the 2010 elections, the National Assembly had 317 members, of which 239 (up from 232) were elected by plurality voting in single-member constituencies, 102 were reserved for women, five elected by the House of Representatives of Zanzibar and up to seven appointed by the president. The Attorney General is also a member of the Assembly.

The Zanzibar House of Representatives had 50 elected members, ten appointed by the President, and 15 seats for women. The women's seats were assigned to parties which won seats in the House, and distributed in proportion to the number of seats held by each party. The House also had six ex officio members, the Attorney General and five Regional Commissioners.

Results

President

National Assembly

Zanzibar

President

House of Representatives

Aftermath
Kikwete's swearing-in ceremony took place on 6 November 2010 at the National Stadium in Dar es Salaam.

See also
Salum Khalfani Bar'wan, a member of the Civic United Front elected from the Lindi Urban constituency; the first person with albinism elected to the National Assembly of Tanzania.

References

Presidential elections in Tanzania
2010
Tanzania
Tanzania